The Nineteenth Congress of the Communist Party of the Soviet Union was held from 5 to 14 October 1952. It was the first  party congress since before World War II and the last under Joseph Stalin's leadership. It was attended by many dignitaries from foreign Communist parties, including Liu Shaoqi from China. At this Congress, Stalin gave the last public speech of his life. The 19th Central Committee was elected at the congress.

Changes
The All-Union Communist Party (Bolshevik) was renamed the Communist Party of the Soviet Union.
Stalin's request to be relieved of his duties in the party secretariat due to his age was rejected by the plenum of the  Central Committee held immediately after the congress, as members were unsure about Stalin's intentions.

The Politburo of the Central Committee became the Presidium of the Central Committee and was greatly expanded to 15 members. The Secretariat and Central Committee were doubled in size (to ten and 133 members, respectively). The Orgburo was abolished, and its duties were transferred to the Secretariat.
Full members (voting) elected to the 19th Presidium:Vasily Andrianov; Averky Aristov; Lavrentiy Beria; Nikolai Bulganin; Kliment Voroshilov; Semyon Ignatyev; Lazar Kaganovich; Demyan Korotchenko; Vasily Kuznetsov; Otto Kuusinen; Georgy Malenkov; Vyacheslav Malyshev; Leonid G. Melnikov; Anastas Mikoyan; Nikolai Mikhaylov; Vyacheslav Molotov; Mikhail Pervukhin; Panteleimon Ponomarenko; Maksim Saburov; Joseph Stalin; Mikhail Suslov; Nikita Khrushchev; Dmitry Chesnokov; Nikolay Shvernik; Matvei Shkiryatov
Candidate (non-voting) members elected to the Presidium:Leonid Brezhnev; Andrei Vyshinsky; Arseni Zverev; Nikolai Ignatov; Ivan Kabanov; Alexei Kosygin; Nikolai Patolichev; Nikolai Pegov; Alexander Puzanov; Ivan Tevosian; Pavel Yudin

An unofficial "inner circle" of Stalin's closest associates included Lavrentiy Beria, Nikolai Bulganin, Kliment Voroshilov, Lazar Kaganovich, Georgy Malenkov, Mikhail Pervukhin, Maksim Saburov, and Nikita Khrushchev.

See also
6th Congress of the Communist Party of Yugoslavia, held from 2 to 7 November 1952.

References

External links
Report to the Nineteenth Party Congress on the Work of the Central Committee of the C.P.S.U.(B.), delivered by Malenkov
Report on the Directives of the XIX Party Congress Relating to the Fifth Five-Year Plan for the Development of the U.S.S.R. in 1951-1955, delivered by Saburov
On Changes in the Rules of the Communist Party of the Soviet Union, delivered by Khrushchev
Speech at the Nineteenth Party Congress by Stalin
Rules of the Communist Party of the Soviet Union adopted by the 19th Congress
Nineteenth Congress of the CPSU in the Great Soviet Encyclopedia, 3rd Edition (1970-1979).
	

Communist Party of the Soviet Union 19
Congress
1952 conferences
February 1956 events in Europe